MotorStorm: Pacific Rift is a racing video game by Evolution Studios and published by Sony Computer Entertainment for the PlayStation 3. It is the sequel to MotorStorm and is followed by MotorStorm: Arctic Edge for the PlayStation 2 and PSP, and MotorStorm: Apocalypse. The game was announced by Sony after their acquisition of Evolution Studios and it was released on 28 October 2008 in North America. The game has sold over one million copies as of 9 December 2008. As of 1 October 2012, the online servers for the game have been permanently shut down.

MotorStorm: 3D Rift is a 3D mini re-release of Pacific Rift, containing 10 tracks as well as a selection of off-road vehicles from Pacific Rift. It is only single-player and has no trophies. The game was released on the PlayStation Network on 24 August 2010.

Gameplay
The game moves away from the desert environments of the original title and relocates itself in "a lush island environment, full of interactive vegetation"; and also includes monster trucks and four-player split-screen capability. Monster trucks are able to ride over cars (except big rigs), break most vegetation, and destroy structures. Bikes also have new capabilities so they can bunny hop and the driver can duck. Custom music tracks using a player's own music stored on their PS3 hard drive are available, as are trophies (to unlock more Drivers and Vehicles) and camera angles are improved for crashes; vehicle damage is also improved. Users can select drivers from the Garage menu, thus not having to rely on picking the vehicles, depending on the Driver's gender. "Speed" events are firstly introduced in the game, which consists numerous checkpoints in each tracks that users must pass through to achieve extra times before the timer runs out. Any class that isn't the ATV or Bikes can ram their vehicles left or right. The ATV and Bike ram by their driver throwing punches at the other drivers.

Tracks

The 16 original tracks are set around volcanic mountainsides, beaches, jungle, caves and a run-down sugar factory. Another new feature in Motorstorm: Pacific Rift is the presence of water in the form of rivers, pools and waterfalls. Water also cools down car's engines, which presents a whole line of new tactics; vehicles will slow down as they go through deep water, with buoyancy featuring for vehicles that venture into water too deep for that vehicle type.

Two expansion packs were released in July 2009 and add a total of six new tracks. The 'Speed' expansion adds three tracks and it also adds three new track variants and new paint jobs. The 'Adrenaline' pack also adds three new tracks but five new track variants, four new vehicles and six new characters. With it there are five track variants, which contains a red partially burnt card, under the name "Volcanic". Variations of the same tracks are turned into a post-apocalyptic volcanic activity, such as lava bombs that are present throughout the race and driving through it will instantly wreck any vehicle that comes through it. Small lava bombs can heat up the boost temperature in an instant, even when the boost temperature is completely low, if driven through it. If the vehicle's boost temperature becomes very hot and the player drives through a small lava bomb, the vehicle could explode.

Vehicles
MotorStorm: Pacific Rift features all seven vehicle classes from the original game (Bikes, ATVs, Buggies, Rally Cars, Racing trucks, Mud Pluggers and Big Rigs) as well as a new class, Monster Trucks. 50 of the 51 vehicles featured in the original MotorStorm appear in the new game (the Patriot 85 Rally Car was left out for some reason) as well as a whole new array of vehicles. This includes vehicles downloaded as part of game packs such as Revenge Weekend and Devil's Weekend.

Development
The first target render teaser trailer of the game was released in March 2008 and showed pre-rendered cut scene featuring destructible environments and realistic character modelling along with the song "Tarantula" by Pendulum.

A patch for MotorStorm: Pacific Rift was released in error within the European region in January 2009. At the same time, the official MotorStorm website was updated saying that the patch had been released and detailed the fixes it contained. The patch was withdrawn from the European servers and the official website returned, which claimed at the time that the patch would be released soon.

Sony later issued a statement on the MotorStorm website confirming that the patch had indeed been erroneously released and then withdrawn, and advised users who had installed the patch not to remove it due to the patch modifying save game files.

In the Update version 1.02, there were new features in MotorStorm: Pacific Rift, known as "Microbadges" and "Signature Collections". With "Microbadges" players could display their badges during online races, up to 5 available badges added to the slot. Several badges were hidden, with no description on how to earn it. The second new feature "Signature Collection", earned the players new skins for every vehicle which was also in the first MotorStorm game for each 10 "microbadges" earned. When players have achieved all the "Microbadges" and "Signature Collection", they could earn hidden rewards.

Demo
A demonstration version of the game was made available in Europe and North America in September 2008. In Europe the demo was made available to randomly selected users. Access to the North American demo required users to purchase episode 4 of Qore. It was available to all users on the PlayStation Store on in October.

The demo consisted of a single-player race and a 2-player split-screen race on Rain God Spires. A total of 8 vehicles were available in the demo: a bike, a monster truck, two buggys, two racing trucks (one of which was selected in both modes) and two rally cars.

A new demo was launched in February 2009 and was called Motorstorm: Pacific Rift demo 2.0. This featured a different track, Razorback, and a different buggy. This demo also allowed the user to play in split-screen. A new demo was released in June 2010 in a collection of a few games.

PlayStation Home
With the version 1.03 patch that was released on 1 July 2009, users of PlayStation Home, the PlayStation 3's community-based service, could fully game launched MotorStorm: Pacific Rift. Game launching is a feature that lets users set up a multiplayer game in Home and then launch into the game directly from Home. At E3 2007, MotorStorm was featured to be one of the games to include game launching but did not.

In August 2009, a themed MotorStorm: Pacific Rift game space was released for the European and North American versions of PlayStation Home. This space was called the "MotorStorm Sphere" and was only available for a limited time. The space was removed in October and was fully launched later that year. Its main feature was the MotorStorm Jukebox that had thirteen songs for users to choose from. The space also featured a video screen advertising the game as well as seating. In Europe's version, when users first accessed the space, the users received MotorStorm Festival Jeans for their avatar. This space, for its short time, was used as a game launching hub for users to meet up and game launch MotorStorm: Pacific Rift. There was also MotorStorm themed biker suits released for users to purchase for their avatars in Home's shopping complex.

In December 2009, a MotorStorm: Pacific Rift themed personal apartment was released for the European and North American versions of Home. This apartment is called the "MotorStorm: Pacific Rift camp" and could be purchased from the Home Estates store in Homes' shopping complex.

Soundtrack
The game features 46 licensed music tracks, nine of which are exclusive to the game. This is in contrast to the original game which had 21 music tracks. Notable artists featured on the Motorstorm: Pacific Rift soundtrack include Megadeth, Nirvana, Queens of the Stone Age, David Bowie, Death from Above 1979, Pendulum, Clutch, Fatboy Slim, Hervé, Qemists and Slipknot, as well as unsigned bands like March and The Planets. The song used in the TV trailer of the game is by Gogol Bordello. Users can play custom soundtracks via the PlayStation 3's XMB.

Reception

The game has been generally well received by critics, with an average review score of 82 out of 100 on Metacritic and 82.49% on GameRankings. IGN gave the game 8.9, praising strong graphical component, and calling the game "a worthy follow-up to one of the PS3's early must-have titles".

GameSpot praised the number of well designed tracks in the game as well as its multiplayer element both online and offline though it criticized the inconsistent handling of the vehicles. 1UP.com praised the level of improvement the game achieved in comparison to the original game, notably the game's new "awe-inspiring" landscape as well as the improved aggressive A.I. competitors, it also praised the game's seamless transitions through various in-game environments such as jungles and beaches rather than just the monotonous desert of the first game.

References

External links
MotorStorm Pacific Rift at PlayStation.Com
Evolution Studios Blog – MotorStorm: Pacific Rift
Official MotorStorm: Pacific Rift website''

2008 video games
PlayStation 3-only games
MotorStorm
Sony Interactive Entertainment games
Video games developed in the United Kingdom
Video games with stereoscopic 3D graphics
Multiplayer and single-player video games
Split-screen multiplayer games
PlayStation 3 games
Evolution Studios games